Sándor Csoóri (3 February 1930 – 12 September 2016) was a Hungarian poet, essayist, writer, and politician.

Biography
In 1950, he graduated from the Reformed College in the town of Pápa (:hu:Pápai Református Kollégium) and then studied at ELTE Institute, but dropped his studies because of illness. He worked in various journals, such as, during 1953-54, The Literary Newspaper and, from 1955 until 1956, he was the poetry section editor in "The New Sound" periodical. In 1956, he could not find work for a while and then, in 1960, as at the beginning of the Budapest University of Technology and newspaper editorial staff, he was the MAFILM dramaturg from 1968 until 1988.

His first poems appeared in 1953, raising a big stir, being critical of the Rákosi era.
The authorities soon noticed that Csoóri was not one of their supporters. He wrote criticizing the dictatorship's impact of personality, and the fate of rural people. He was under surveillance sometimes for years, and did not receive awards. He lived in Budapest, where he met with his friends, including Miklós Jancsó, Ottó Orbán, György Konrád, Ferenc Kósa.  In 1988, he was co-editor with Gáspár Nagy, of Hitel, and in 1992 editor-in-chief.

Csoóri died at the age of 86 after a long illness on 12 September 2016.

Awards
 Attila József Prize (1954, 1970)
 Herder Prize (1981)
 István Bibó Prize (1984)
 The Book of the Year Award (1985, 1995, 2004)
 Tibor Déry Prize (1987)
 Joseph Fitz Award (1989)
 Kossuth Prize (1990, 2012)
 Sower Nívódíja Publishing (1990)
 Radnóti Biennial Poetry prize (1990)
 Eeva Joenpelto Award (1995)
 Károli Gáspár Award (1997)
 Hungarian Heritage Award (1997, 2005)
 Order of Merit of the Republic of Hungary, Commander's Crosses with Star, civilian (:hu:A Magyar Köztársasági Érdemrend középkeresztje a csillaggal, 2000)
 Hungarian Art Prize (2004)
 Bálint Balassi Memorial Sword Award (2006)
 Prima Primissima Award, 2008

Works in English
"Letter to the American Poet, Gregory Corso", AGNI
"A Hidden Self-Portrait";  "A Wind-Crown on My Head"; "Devastation", "I Hunt Yellow Bird", The Drunken Boat

References

External links
"Before and After the Fall", The Montserrat Review, Grace Cavalieri
Official homepage of Balint Balassi Memorial Sword Award which is founded by Pal Molnar 
this article includes material from this article in Kezdőlap

1930 births
2016 deaths
Hungarian male poets
Hungarian essayists
Male essayists
Hungarian Democratic Forum politicians
Budapest University of Technology and Economics alumni
Commander's Crosses with Star of the Order of Merit of the Republic of Hungary (civil)
20th-century Hungarian poets
21st-century Hungarian poets
20th-century essayists
21st-century essayists
Herder Prize recipients
20th-century Hungarian male writers
21st-century Hungarian male writers
Attila József Prize recipients